Fairfield is an unincorporated community in Swift County, Minnesota, United States.

Notes

Unincorporated communities in Swift County, Minnesota
Unincorporated communities in Minnesota